DELPHI (standing for "DEtector with Lepton, Photon and Hadron Identification") was one of the four main detectors of the Large Electron–Positron Collider (LEP) at CERN, one of the largest particle accelerators ever made. Like the other three detectors,  it recorded and analyzed the result of the collision between LEP's colliding particle beams.

DELPHI had the shape of a cylinder over 10 metres in length and diameter, and a weight of 3500 tons. In operation, electrons and positrons from the accelerator went through a pipe going through the center of the cylinder, and collided in the middle of the detector. The collision products then travelled outwards from the pipe and were analyzed by many subdetectors designed to identify the nature and trajectories of the particles produced by the collision.

DELPHI was constructed between 1983 and 1988, and LEP started operation in 1989. After LEP was decommissioned in November 2000, DELPHI began to be dismantled, and dismantling was complete in September 2001.

References

External links
 Official website
Record for DELPHI experiment on INSPIRE-HEP

CERN experiments
Particle experiments